Medlov is a municipality and village in Olomouc District in the Olomouc Region of the Czech Republic. It has about 1,600 inhabitants.

Administrative parts
Villages of Hlivice, Králová and Zadní Újezd are administrative parts of Medlov.

Notable people
Anton Schindler (1795–1864), musician and music writer

References

Villages in Olomouc District